The Robert W. Clarke Trophy is presented annually to the AHL's champion of the Western Conference during the playoffs.  Prior to 1998, it was given to the champion of the Southern Conference/Division.

The award is named after former AHL Chairman of the Board Robert W. Clarke.

Winners

Winner by season
Key
‡ = Eventual Calder Cup champions

References

External links
Official AHL website
AHL Hall of Fame

American Hockey League trophies and awards